A transformation mask, also known as an opening mask, is a type of mask used by indigenous people of the Northwest Coast and Alaska in ritual dances. These masks usually depict an outer, animal visage, which the performer can open by pulling a string to reveal an inner human face carved in wood to symbolize the wearer moving from the natural world to a supernatural realm. Northwest coast peoples generally use them in potlatches to illustrate myths, while they are used by Alaska natives for shamanic rituals.

Transformation 
Transformation masks are used to embody the act of transforming. These transformations usually portray an animal becoming another animal or an animal transforming into a fabled creature.

Myths and animals 
During ceremonies and rituals, the transformation masks would sometimes be used to transform indigenous people of the Northwest Coast into animals or mythic creatures. According to native legends, transformation was often related to supernatural creatures such as tricksters - typically a god or goddess who uses their knowledge to cause chaos among humans.

Potlatches and ceremonies 
As a way of honouring the natural milestones of Native American life, the Kwakwaka'wakw people, a Native American tribe that originates in the Pacific Northwest Coast, celebrates Potlatch. Potlatch is a tradition that includes wearing transformation masks, singing, and dancing. The ceremony is meant to celebrate the rituals of name-giving, inducting a new chief of the tribe, and honoring a death or marriage. 

Potlatch ceremonies were used to establish social order, distribute resources and convey information to the clan. Typically, these masks were carved by master carvers of the First Nations of the Pacific Northwest Coastal region.

The word “Potlatch” comes from the Chinook word “to give." Potlatch ceremonies were conducted in a big community space called the Big House. Frequently, these ceremonies involve the telling of the origin story of the first Nations' group or clan.

Settlers, missionaries and the Canadian government sought to end the Potlatch because they wanted the indigenous people to assimilate to Anglo-Saxon beliefs and customs. In 1884, the Canadian government started a ban on Potlatch ceremonies that lasted until 1969.

Materials and design 
To make the masks, natural, organic materials are used such as red cedar bark and other types of wood that are commonly used by these tribes to construct buildings and other structures. The masks are usually made using a color palette of earthy tones such as red, blue, green, and black, though other colors are sometimes used as well. The colors are made by using plants and minerals that were available to them in their natural surroundings.

Modern transformation masks 
While very little seems to be known about the original masks and how they were used, one artist, Shawn Hunt, wanted to recreate a mask with the assistance of modern technology. Transformation Mask, a 3D-printed, meter-long replica of the Raven was released in 2018 with the help of Microsoft Vancouver. The wearer of the mask experiences it opening and closing, along with ambient light and sound coupled with holographics.

Seattle Seahawks logo 
Before the Seattle Seahawks took part in 2014's Super Bowl, Robin K. Wright, Curator of Native American Art at Burke Museum, questioned the inspiration behind the design of the American football team's logo. Wright met with Burke Museum Curator Emeritus Bill Holm, who then showed her a picture of a Kwakwaka'wakw eagle mask displayed in Art of the Northwest Coast Indians by Robert Bruce Inverarity. Wright noticed that the transformation mask was almost identical to the team's original logo from 1976.

When the Seattle Seahawks discovered a forgotten newspaper article in their database from 1975, John Thompson, the Seahawks General Manager from 1976 to 1982, officially confirmed the influence behind the design for the team's 1976 logo.

Marvin Oliver, an artist who once worked alongside Holm, was inspired by the football team's first logo and created a redesign in 1975 that followed a more traditional form of the northern Northwest Coast principles. During the creation of the logo's original design in 1975, traditional art from tribes such as Tlingit, Haida, Tsimshian and Kwakwaka'wakw were becoming more and more familiar along the Pacific Northwest Coast. The reason for the art's familiarity dates back to the 19th century. On steam ship trips, American travelers passed by totem poles, a popularity during this time. In 1899, a design was stolen from one of the poles and later became an icon for Seattle, Washington.

The original eagle mask that influenced the Seattle Seahawks' 1976 logo was discovered in the northeast side of Vancouver Island.

In 2014, The University of Maine's Hudson Museum held the original, eagle mask in their collection. Hudson Museum then heard news that Burke Museum was searching for the location of the inspired Seattle Seahawk's logo. Upon hearing this news, they offered the mask to Burke Museum. Shortly after the mask's arrival, Wright and her team of artists were accompanied by artist Bruce Alfred, a member of the Namgis Band of the Kwakwaka'wakw Nations, to examine the transformation mask.

Upon examination, the mask revealed marks that proved the origin of the mask, along with evidence that the mask was used in Native American ceremonies. The mask, presented as an eagle or thunderbird, was meant to portray an animal to human transformation.

Burke Museum in Seattle, Washington displayed the original transformation mask as part of an exhibit inspired by Native American artists from November 22, 2014, to July 27, 2015.

Gallery

See also
Masks among Eskimo peoples

References
   
Davidson, Sarah and Robert Davidson. Potlach as Pedagogy: Learning Through Ceremony. Portage & Main Publishing , 2018. Print.
Edson, Gary. Masks and Masking: Faces of Tradition and Belief Worldwide. McFarland, 2015. Print.
Garage, Microsoft and Shawn Hunt. "Transformation Mask." Leonardo, vol. 51 no. 4, 2018, p. 435-436. Project MUSE muse.jhu.edu/article/702032.
“Origin of the Seahawks Logo: The Story Unfolds.” Burke Museum, Burke Museum, 27 Jan. 2015, https://www.burkemuseum.org/news/origin-seahawks-logo-story-unfolds.
“The History of the Potlatch Collection.” U'mista Cultural Centre, www.umista.ca/pages/collection-history.
“Transformation Masks.” Khan Academy, Khan Academy, www.khanacademy.org/humanities/ap-art-history/indigenous-americas/a/transformation-masks.

Wright, Robin K. “The Mask That Inspired the Seahawks Logo.” Burke Museum, Burke Museum, 28 Jan. 2014, https://www.burkemuseum.org/news/mask-inspired-seahawks-logo.

External links
Entry on the website of the Minneapolis Institute of Arts
Canadian Museum of Civilization example
Alaskan example from the Smithsonian

Pacific Northwest art
Indigenous woodcarving of the Americas
Masks in the Americas